Sabi Acquah Ferdinand (born 13 May 1997) is a Ghanaian footballer who currently plays as a goalkeeper for Ghana Premier League side WAFA.

Career 
Ferdinand started his career with West African Football Academy in August 2018. He made his debut during the 2019 GFA Normalization Competition, keeping the post in a match against Liberty Professionals. The match ended in a 3–1 victory for WAFA. He eventually became the first choice goalkeeper and played 12 out of 14 matches within the competition. During the 2019–20 season, he made 7 league appearances, kept 5 clean sheets prior to the league being cancelled due to the COVID-19 pandemic in Ghana.

During the 2020–21 season, in a match against Karela United during match day 16, he was adjudged man of the match after pulling up an impressive performance to help WAFA to a 3–1 victory.

Style of play 
Ferdinand has stated that his main influence is his idol, German goalkeeper Marc-André ter Stegen, whom he regards as the one of the best in the trade and therefore learns lessons from his style of play including his quick reflexes, kicking, command on his back line and aerial abilities.

References

External links 

 

Living people
1997 births
Association football goalkeepers
Ghanaian footballers
West African Football Academy players
Ghana Premier League players